Dennis Thrower (1 August 1938 – 6 August 2018) was an English professional footballer who played for Ipswich Town.

Career
Thrower made his debut for his hometown club against Bournemouth in a 1–0 victory in August 1956 but had to wait until the 1962–63 season before making his second.  He left the club in 1965 and joined nearby non-league team Bury Town.    He also made appearances for Sudbury Town and Crane Sports, before managing Whitton United and Woodbridge Town.  He also ran a plumbing business.

Personal life
He had two children, Andrea and Gary.

References

1938 births
2018 deaths
Ipswich Town F.C. players
English Football League players
Southern Football League players
Sportspeople from Ipswich
Sudbury Town F.C. players
Bury Town F.C. players
English footballers
English football managers
Association football wing halves
Whitton United F.C. managers
Woodbridge Town F.C. managers